, stylized as GiFTPiA, is a video game, developed by Skip Ltd. for the GameCube. It was released in Japan on April 25, 2003. Nintendo cancelled the North American localization of Giftpia. In English, the game would most likely be better understood as called "Giftopia" to represent the two words, gift and utopia.

Plot and gameplay

Giftpia follows the protagonist Pockle, a resident of Nanashi Island, who, on the day of his coming of age ceremony, oversleeps and misses the whole thing. The mayor of the island, Mayer, is so incensed that he orders Pockle's arrest and a fine of five million "Mane" (the game's currency) to recoup the costs of the event. Thus, it is up to Pockle to work off his huge debt. At the game's start, Pockle must cope with heavy restrictions: an early curfew, a ball & chain, having his face pixelated and having robot police chief Mappo supervise him. Throughout his adventure, Pockle is assisted by his dog Tao and his girlfriend Kyappa. There is also a large cast of supporting characters that live on Nanashi Island and interact with Pockle, including a bartender that goes by Peevee and a radio DJ called DEEJ. Pockle eventually encounters an old man who will give him some mushroom soup and teach him about other paths to adulthood via helping others.

Giftpia is similar to Nintendo's Animal Crossing in that both games place an emphasis on interacting with other characters. In order to meet the game's five million Mane requirement, the player must initially take menial jobs such as fishing, collecting fruit, or repairing signs. After meeting the old man, the player must travel the island, collecting its residents' wishes, and fulfill them. However, the player has numerous restrictions that are lifted as the game progresses. For instance, if the player stays out after curfew, ghosts will chase Pockle to his house. If he does not make it back, he will be put to sleep, making him vulnerable to theft. The player is also responsible for making Pockle eat, as he will otherwise starve to death.

Development
GiFTPiA was announced in early 2002 under the development of Skip Ltd. and the direction of former Square employee Kenichi Nishi. Game designer Shigeru Miyamoto signed on as one of the game's producers. According to the Japanese newspaper Nihon Keizai Shimbun, Nintendo provided half of the game's ¥500 million budget.

Although the game was shown at E3 2003 in English and a North American localization seemed likely, the game remained exclusive to Japan. Nintendo stated that the game was not announced for a North America release. The website IGN thought that the game was not going to be released due to being "too strange" for US audiences, an assumption that was confirmed by Nintendo of America in early 2006. One of the game's planners, Sayoko Yokote, hoped the game would be localized by a company other than Nintendo.

The music in GiFTPiA is provided via the in-game radio known as Nanashi-FM. The musical score was co-composed by Hirofumi Taniguchi and Yousuke Obitsumi and features over a dozen musical artists on the radio stations. The soundtrack was released on July 14, 2003, by Enterbrain alongside the Giftpia Book, a 99-page full color guide to the game.

Reception
Retail sales of Giftpia were unexceptional at best. According to estimates from Media Create and Dengeki, the game sold between 48,000 and 55,000 units during its first three weeks on sale in Japan. By the end of 2003, the game had sold nearly 70,000 units, ranking it 176th among all games in the country for that year.

Giftpia was given a total score of 34 out of 40 by Famitsu, earning it a "Gold Award". The reviewers remarked that although game gives the initial impression it is for children, it offers "nice puzzle elements, great characters and a wonderful score". GiFTPiA was awarded a curious review score of ??% by the UK-based NGC Magazine. They felt unable to review it properly, but were sure that there was "...clearly a quite brilliant game lurking beneath the reams of Japanese text".

References

External links
Official webpage 

2003 video games
Adventure games
GameCube games
GameCube-only games
Japan-exclusive video games
Nintendo games
Role-playing video games
Video games developed in Japan
Video games produced by Shigeru Miyamoto
Skip Ltd. games
Social simulation video games
Video games set on fictional islands
Video games with cel-shaded animation
Single-player video games